Sweet Pill is an American emo band from New Jersey. The band consists of vocalist Zayna Youssef, guitarist Jayce Williams, guitarist Sean McCall, bassist Ryan Cullen, and drummer Chris Kearney.

History
Sweet Pill formed in early 2019 while Youssef was attending Rowan University and looking to get more involved in the music scene. The band released their debut single "Doubt" in March 2019. Their first EP, Lost In It, followed one month later. In March 2022, the group announced their upcoming debut album while releasing its first single, "Blood". Sweet Pill released a second single from the album, "High Hopes", on April 6. The band released the third single from the album, "Diamond Eyes", a few weeks prior to the album's release. The album, Where the Heart Is, was released on May 25, 2022.

Between September and October 2022, Sweet Pill opened for post-hardcore band La Dispute on their US and Canada tour.

Discography
Studio albums
Where the Heart Is (2022, Topshelf Records)
EPs
Lost In It (2019)

References

American emo musical groups
Musical groups from New Jersey
Musical groups established in 2019